J.-Alfred Belzile (August 24, 1907 – August 18, 1994) is a Canadian former politician and farmer.

Born in Amqui, Quebec, Canada, he was elected to the House of Commons of Canada in 1958 as a Member of the Progressive Conservative Party to represent the riding of Matapédia—Matane. He was re-elected in 1962 but defeated in 1963. He was also defeated in 1957.

References

External links
 

1907 births
1994 deaths
Members of the House of Commons of Canada from Quebec
Progressive Conservative Party of Canada MPs
People from Amqui